Iain Bertram Hamilton (3 February 1920 – 15 July 1986) was a Scottish journalist, author and poet.

Hamilton was educated at Paisley Grammar School, and initially worked as a reporter on the Daily Record in Glasgow before heading south to London to work as on the staff of The Guardian. From 1952, he was associated with the weekly journal The Spectator, and after several promotions through the ranks he was appointed Editor in 1962, staying in that position for a year. He was Editorial Director of the Hutchinson group of publishing companies from 1958 to 1962, and after leaving The Spectator became managing director of Kern House Enterprises (1970–5). In addition, he wrote a good many articles for the Illustrated London News and the high-brow current affairs magazine Encounter.

The best known of Hamilton's literary works is his biography of Arthur Koestler, published by Secker & Warburg, London, in 1982 (a year before Koestler's death). His other books were:

Spectrum: A Spectator Miscellany (1956), ed. with Ian Gilmour 
Scotland the Brave (1957)
Half a Highlander: An Autobiography of a Scottish Youth (1958)
The Foster Gang (1966), with H. J. May 
Embarkation for Cythera (1974)
The Kerry Kyle (1980)

He also wrote a play early in his career, The Snarling Beggar (1951).

Reviews
 Ross, Robert (1982), review of Koestler, in Hearn, Sheila G. (ed.), Cencrastus No. 10, Autumn 1982, p. 48,

References

External links

1920 births
1986 deaths
British writers
The Spectator editors